Alejandro Hernández Díaz (born 1970) is a Cuban screenwriter, novelist and lecturer based in Spain. He is a recurring co-scribe of the films directed Manuel Martín Cuenca and Mariano Barroso.

Biography 
Alejandro Hernández Díaz was born in 1970 in Havana. He served as a private in the Angolan Civil War. In 2000, he settled in Spain, wherein he has developed a career as a screenwriter. In addition to his published work and film credits, he has also lectured on journalism and audiovisual communication at the Charles III University of Madrid.

Work

Filmography 
Film

Television

Novels 
 La milla (Letras Cubanas, 1996)
 Algún demonio (Salto de Página, 2007)
 Oro ciego (Salto de Página, 2009)

Accolades

References

Bibliography 
 

Cuban screenwriters
Cuban novelists
1970 births
Living people
Academic staff of the Charles III University of Madrid